Mycosphaerella striatiformans is a fungal plant pathogen.

See also
 List of Mycosphaerella species

References

striatiformans
Fungal plant pathogens and diseases
Fungi described in 1906